Black Tower may refer to:

Constructions

 Black Tower (Brașov), a 15th-century guard tower in Braşov, Romania, used today as a museum.
 Black Tower (Brussels), a 13th-century medieval tower, notable for being one single medieval tower, standing amidst the modern day buildings of Brussels, Belgium.
 Black Tower (České Budějovice), or Černá věž, a well-known 16th-century tower in České Budějovice, Czech Republic.

Written works

 The Black Tower, an Adam Dalgliesh mystery novel by P. D. James

Culture and entertainment

 The Black Tower (TV miniseries), a 1985 TV mini-series based on the popular novel by P. D. James
 Black Tower Studios (Developer), a video game developer

Fictional locations
 Headquarters for the Asha'man in Robert Jordan's Wheel of Time fictional universe